Hologymnosus rhodonotus, the redback longface wrasse or the red slender wrasse, is a species of marine ray-finned fish from the family Labridae, the wrasses. It is distributed in the western Pacific Ocean from Japan to Indonesia, as far south as the Timor Sea in Australian waters.

References

rhodonotus
Fish described in 1988